Faculty of Social Sciences (Slovene: Fakulteta za družbene vede; FDV) is one of the faculties, comprising the University of Ljubljana. It is located at Kardeljeva ploščad (Bežigrad District, Ljubljana).

The faculty is "the central Slovenian interdisciplinary, educational, scientific and research institution in the area of social sciences, and ranks among the biggest institutions of its kind in Europe." At the same time, is "one of the largest academic units of the University of Ljubljana with 27 graduate and postgraduate programmes in political science, communication, journalism, and cultural studies. Currently, it is also the largest public teaching and research institution in Slovenia, devoted to interdisciplinary studies.

Faculty was established in 1961 as the "College of Political Sciences" (Visoka šola za politične vede,  VŠPV), which was in 1968 renamed into the "College of Sociology, Political Sciences and Journalism" (Visoka šola za sociologijo, politične vede in novinarstvo; VŠSPN). Two years later (in 1970), the college became part of the University of Ljubljana and was reorganized into the "Faculty of Sociology, Political Sciences and Journalism" (Fakulteta za sociologijo, politične vede in novinarstvo; FSPN). In 1991, the faculty was once more renamed as "Faculty of Social Sciences" (Fakulteta za družbene vede; FDV).

History 

College of Political Sciences (Visoka šola za politične vede, VŠPV) was established on 31 January 1961 and on 2 October of the same year it officially opened. The primary mission of the newly-formed college was to provide educated cadre for the League of Communists of Slovenia, and thus "to help control the society and state".

At that time, the teaching staff were organized in four chairs: of philosophy and sociology, of economics, of social-political system and of international relations. In the first study year (1961/62), there were 31 regular and 48 extraordinary studenty at the 2nd level.

In 1963, the first chair of Journalism, headed by France Vreg, was formed, which was at that time also the first such study program in whole Yugoslavia. In the same year, the college started to offer also postgraduate program (master's degree in political science). The official start of journalism study is in the study year of 1964/65.

In 1963, a student dorm was built above the building of VŠPV with around 280 beds for students. Due to the fact, that this was only the second co-ed student dorm in Ljubljana and that was located by the VŠPV, it was nicknamed Marx's Brothel (Marxov bordel). In 2001, the dorm was evicted, demolished in 2003-04 and then in 2006, the new dorm was built.

Three years later, in 1966, first research centers were formed in the college. Next year (1967), a new master's degree was offered - in sociology. In 1968, the college was renamed into the College of Sociology, Political Science and Journalism (Visoka šola za sociologijo, politične vede in novinarstvo; VŠSPVN).

In 1968, the Public Opinion Center (current name: Public Opinion and Mass Communication Research Centre) was formed as part of the college.

Already in 1970, the college became a member of the University of Ljubljana (the 10th member of the University), and was at the same time reorganized into the Faculty of Sociology, Political Science and Journalism (Fakulteta za sociologijo, politične vede in novinarstvo; FSPVN). In 1974, a new study program was introduced - "General People's Defence and Societal selfprotection" (splošna ljudska obramba in družbena samozaščita), which was later developed into defence studies. In 1975, four FSPN professors (Vladimir Arzenšek, Tine Hribar, Janez Jerovšek and Veljko Rus) were removed from their teaching positions, because of their liberal views and for not including in their works more emphesis on Marxism, wrongly defined self-management and neglected the revolucionary role of the working class.

By 1986, the faculty had five study programs: sociology (with three disciplines), political science (with two disciplines), journalism, self-management with foundations of Marxism and defence studies.

In 1991, the Institute of Sociology (until then independent organization) merged with the Research Institute FSPN into the Social Sciences Research Institute. In the same year, the faculty is renamed into the Faculty of Social Sciences (Fakulteta za družbene vede; FDV).

In 1995, the FDV Publishing House was formed and in 1997 also the Social Science Data Archive (Arhiv družboslovnih podatkov; ADP).

In 2005, the faculty started to offer first Bologna Process study programs.

Study 
Currently, faculty is offering these study programs:
 1st level (bachelor degrees)
 Social Informatics
 Communication Studies - Media and Communication Studies
 Communication Studies - Marketing Communication and Public Relations
 Cultural Studies – Studies of Cultures and Creativity
 International Relations
 Journalism
 Defence Studies
 Political Science – Public Policies and Administration
 Political Science – Studies of Politics and the State
 Sociology
 Sociology - Human Resources Management

 2nd level (master's degrees)
 Social Informatics (offered in English)
 European Studies (offered in English)
 Communication Studies - Media and Communication Studies
 Cultural Studies
 International Relations (offered in English)
 Journalism
 Defence and Security Studies
 Political Science – Political Theory, Global and Strategic Studies (offered in English)
 Political Science – Comperative Studies of Politics and Administration
 Sociology
 Sociology - Human Resources, Knowledge and Organisational Management
 Marketing Communication and Public Relations

 Interdisciplinary 2nd level (master's programs)
 Applied Statistics

 Joint and Double Degrees Study Programmes
 European Master’s Degree in Human Rights and Democratisation (E.MA)

 3rd level (Ph.D.)
 Interdisciplinary Doctoral Programme The Humanities and Social Sciences
 American Studies
 Balkan Studies
 Communication Sciences
 Cultural Studies
 Defence Studies
 Developmental Studies
 Diplomacy
 Environmental and Spatial Studies
 Epistemology of the Humanities and Social Sciences
 Ethnic and Migration Studies
 European Studies
 Gender Studies
 Globalisation Studies
 Human Resources and Organisational Studies
 International Relations
 Journalism Studies
 Life Course Studies
 Marketing Communication
 Media Studies
 Military Sociology Studies
 Policy Analysis
 Political Science
 Psychology of Communication
 Public Administration
 Public Relations
 Religious Studies
 Security Studies
 Social and Political Anthropology
 Social and Political Psychology
 Social Informatics
 Social Sciences Methodology
 Sociology
 Studies of Everyday Life

 Doctoral programmes organised at the university level
 Environmental Protection
 Statistics

Organization 

Currently, the Faculty has the following departments and chairs:
 Department of Sociology
 Chair of Theoretical Sociology
 Chair for Organizational and Human Resource Management and Development
 Chair of Social Informatics and Methodology
 Department of Political Science
 Chair of Theoretical Political Science
 Chair of Policy Analysis and Public Administration
 Chair of International Relations
 Chair of Defence Studies
 Department of Communication
 Chair of Media Studies
 Chair of Journalism
 Chair of Marketing Communications and Public Relations
 Department of Cultural Studies
 Chair of Cultural Studies
 Chairs at the faculty level
 Chair of foreign languages

People

Teaching staff 
In the school year of 2020/21, 115 university teachers were employed at the faculty.

Among the most prominent teachers in the history of the faculty are:
 Aleš Debeljak (1961-2016), poet, writer, editor, sociologist of culture
 Pavel Gantar (1949-), former speaker of the Slovenian National Assembly (2008–11)
 Ljubica Jelušič (1960-), former minister of defence (2008–12) (Chair of Defense Studies) 
 Manca Košir (1948-), journalist, politician (Chair of Journalism)
 Igor Lukšič (1961-), former minister of education and sport (2008–12), former president of the Social Democrats (2012–14) (Chair of Political Sciences)
 Anton Grizold (1956-), former minister of defence (2000–02) (Chair of Defense Studies)

Graduates 
By the study year 2020/21, 13,909 people completed bachelor programs, 50 completed specialized programs, 3,073 completed master study programs (of those 1,534 completed pre-Bologna scientific master programs) and 490 people completed doctoral programs.

Among the most prominent graduates of the faculty are:
 Darja Bavdaž Kuret (1956-), diplomat (ambassador)
 Urška Bračko (1993-), photomodel
 Alenka Bratušek, former Prime Minister of Slovenia (2013–14)
 Mihael Brejc, former Member of the European Parliament (2004–09), former Minister of Labour, Family and Social Affairs (2000)
 Milan Brglez, former speaker of the Slovenian National Assembly (2014–18), Member of the European Parliament (2019–24)
 Pavel Gantar (1949-), former speaker of the Slovenian National Assembly (2008–11)
 Klemen Grošelj, Member of the European Parliament (2019–24)
 Spomenka Hribar, author, philosopher, sociologist, politician
 Janez Janša, former and current Prime Minister of Slovenia (2003–08; 2012–13; 2020-), former minister of defense (1990–94; 2000)
 Marjetka Jeršek (1961-), writer and painter
 Darja Kapš (1981-), Woman Grandmaster (Chess)
 Mojca Kleva (1976-), Member of the European Parliament (2011–14)
 Jožef Školč (1960-), former speaker of the Slovenian National Assembly (1994–96)
 Igor Šoltes (1964-), Member of the European Parliament (2014–29) 
 Alojz Šteiner (1957-), Chief of Generalstaff of the Slovenian Armed Forces (2009–12)
 Gregor Tomc (1952-), musician and politician
 Matej Tonin (1983-), former minister of defence (2020-21), former speaker of the Slovenian National Assembly (2018)

Publishing and journals 
 Javnost-The Public
 Journal of Comparative Politics
 Journal of International Relations and Development
 Metodološki zvezki (Advances in Methodology and Statistics)
 Teorija in praksa

Links and references

External links 

 Official site

Social Sciences
Educational institutions established in 1961
1961 establishments in Yugoslavia
 
Bežigrad District